Lover is a 2022 Indian Punjabi-language film directed by Dilsher Singh & Khushpal Singh. The film is produced by KV Dhillon. It stars Guri, Ronak Joshi, Yashpal Sharma and Avtar Gill. The film theatrically released on 1 July 2022.

Cast 
Guri as Lally 
Ronak Joshi as Heer 
Yashpal Sharma as Dilawar Singh
Avtar Gill as Gupta 
Rupinder Rupi as Heer's mother
Karan Sandhiwalia as Gopi

Production 
Filming began on 24 August 2021 and completed on 29 September 2021.

Reception 
Kiddaan.com gave three out of five stars, stating that "A Musical Treat With An Average Story But Commendable Performances". Decodecinema gave 0 out of 5 stars stating that "a cheap story with a cheap plot, a cheap direction and a cheap writing and this movie is for 'bhoond ashiks' only"

Soundtrack

Track list

References

External links 

 

2022 films
Punjabi-language Indian films
Indian romance films
2020s Punjabi-language films